The Southeast Asian long-fingered bat (Miniopterus fuscus) is a species of vesper bat in the family Miniopteridae. It is endemic to Japan and has been assessed as endangered by the IUCN.

Description and biology 
Females give birth to a single young in early June. The species forages over forests and mainly feeds on butterflies, moths, Hymenoptera, and flies.

Habitat and distribution 
The species is found in Amami-Oshima, Tokuno-shima, Okinoerabu Island, Okinawa Island, Kume Island, Ishigaki, and Iriomote Island in Japan. It was collected from the Kii peninsula in Honshu in 1933, but is now considered extinct there.

It inhabits forests and roosts in mines and caves, in colonies of several hundred individuals. There were large maternity colonies in the past, but these have become rare. There is a colony of 10,000 females on Okinawa Island.

Conservation 
The species has been assessed as endangered by the IUCN Red List due to its small area of inhabitance, degradation of its habitat, and disturbance of caves where it roosts. Some caves roosted by this species are lined with electricity for tourism and also face development near the caves. A new airport has been constructed nearby on Ishigaki Island above several caves frequented by these bats. It does not occur in any protected areas.

References

Miniopteridae
Bats of Asia
Taxonomy articles created by Polbot
Mammals described in 1902
Taxa named by J. Lewis Bonhote
Endemic mammals of Japan